Temnora wollastoni is a moth of the family Sphingidae. It is found from Liberia, east to the Central African Republic and then south to the Democratic Republic of the Congo, the Republic of the Congo and Gabon.

The length of the forewings is about 22 mm. It is similar to Temnora zantus zantus, but the forewing upperside apical area is the same dark brown as the basal area of the wing. The forewing upperside has numerous transverse brown lines, crenulated in the basal part, dentate in the distal part, with an oblique band which is widest at the costa and reaches the outer margin. The hindwing upperside is brown, with a black marginal dot at the tornus and marginal vein dots.

References

Temnora
Moths described in 1908
Insects of the Democratic Republic of the Congo
Fauna of the Central African Republic
Fauna of Gabon
Moths of Africa